The 2019 LSU Tigers women's gymnastics team will represent Louisiana State University in the 2019 NCAA Division I women's gymnastics season as members of the Southeastern Conference in their 44th season of collegiate competition. The Tigers' home meets will take place at the Pete Maravich Assembly Center in Baton Rouge, Louisiana. They will be led by head coach D-D Breaux in her forty-first season at the helm of the program. The Tigers will look to build on a fourth place finish at the 2018 NCAA Women's Gymnastics Championship.

Previous season 
The Tigers finished the 2018 season with an overall record of 33-5. In the postseason, the Tigers won the 2018 Southeastern Conference Championships—their third conference title. Subsequently LSU entered the NCAA Regional competition as the No. 2 national seed, winning the Raleigh regional and advancing to Nationals. At the National Championships, the Tigers finished second in the first semi-final and advanced to the Super Six where they eventually finished fourth. Seven members of the 2018 Tigers cohort received All-American honors.

Off season

Departures

2018 recruiting class

Schedule

Regular season

Postseason

Roster

Coaching staff

References 

2019 NCAA Division I women's gymnastics season
LSU Tigers women's gymnastics
2019 in sports in Louisiana